Aleksandar Kosorić (born 30 January 1987) is a Bosnian professional footballer who plays as a centre-back for Bosnian Premier League club Željezničar.

Club career
Kosorić played for Slavija Sarajevo from 2004 to 2008. In January 2009, he moved to Serbian SuperLiga club Partizan after being noticed during a friendly game played between Partizan and Slavija in the summer of 2008. After not getting many chances there, he moved in January 2010 to another Belgrade club, Rad.

During the winter break of the 2011–12 season, Kosorić moved to Radnički 1923. A year later he would leave Serbia and move to Iraq to join Erbil playing in the Iraqi Premier League. After Iraq, he returned to Serbia and played the second half of the 2013–14 season with Radnički Niš.

In the summer of 2014, Kosorić joined Bosnian Premier League club Željezničar and played for the next two and half years at the Sarajevo based club. While playing at Željezničar, Kosorić became the team captain and received a call for the national team. He left Željezničar in December 2016.

After Željezničar, Kosorić played for Radnik Bijeljina in 2017 and for Spartaks Jūrmala from 2017 to 2018 with whom he won the Latvian Championship in 2017. On 10 November 2018, Kosorić left Spartaks.

On 3 January 2019, Kosorić signed with Maltese Premier League club Balzan. He won his first trophy with Balzan on 18 May 2019, the 2018–19 Maltese FA Trophy after beating Valletta in the final. He decided to terminate his contract and leave the club in January 2020.

On 30 January 2020, Kosorić came back to Željezničar, signing a two-and-a-half-year contract with the club. On 17 October 2020, in a league win against Olimpik, he made his 100th appearance for Željezničar.

International career
Kosorić made his Bosnia and Herzegovina national team debut in the final of the 2016 Kirin Cup against Japan as a 90th-minute substitute.

Honours
Partizan
Serbian SuperLiga: 2008–09, 2009–10
Serbian Cup: 2008–09

Spartaks Jūrmala
Latvian Higher League: 2017

Balzan
Maltese FA Trophy: 2018–19

Bosnia and Herzegovina 
Kirin Cup: 2016

References

External links

Aleksandar Kosorić Stats at Utakmica.rs

1987 births
Living people
People from Pale, Bosnia and Herzegovina
Serbs of Bosnia and Herzegovina
Association football central defenders
Bosnia and Herzegovina footballers
Bosnia and Herzegovina under-21 international footballers
Bosnia and Herzegovina international footballers
FK Slavija Sarajevo players
FK Partizan players
FK Rad players
FK Radnički 1923 players
Erbil SC players
FK Radnički Niš players
FK Željezničar Sarajevo players
FK Radnik Bijeljina players
FK Spartaks Jūrmala players
Balzan F.C. players
Premier League of Bosnia and Herzegovina players
Serbian SuperLiga players
Latvian Higher League players
Maltese Premier League players
Bosnia and Herzegovina expatriate footballers
Expatriate footballers in Serbia
Bosnia and Herzegovina expatriate sportspeople in Serbia
Expatriate footballers in Iraq
Expatriate footballers in Latvia
Bosnia and Herzegovina expatriate sportspeople in Latvia
Expatriate footballers in Malta
Bosnia and Herzegovina expatriate sportspeople in Malta